Lü Jianjun is a Chinese football player who currently plays as a defender for Shijiazhuang Ever Bright.

Club career
Lü Jianjun  played for the Dalian Shide youth team, where he was highly regarded and compared to the Chinese international player Sun Jihai as well as also acquiring the nickname "Great White" due to his pale complexion. He struggled to follow in the former Chinese internationals alumnus footsteps and break into the first team. He instead officially started his professional football career with Dalian Changbo, playing in the second tier of Chinese soccer. Making an immediate impact within the team in his debut season he played 23 games and scoring 2 goals in his debut season.

In the 2006 Chinese league season he transferred to ambitious third-tier club Harbin Yiteng where he immediately saw them win promotion to the second tier. This was soon followed by his selection for the Chinese U-23 football team before returning to his club where he played in 13 games throughout the 2007 league season. His performances for the Chinese youth team soon  attracted the interests of Changchun Yatai who paid a transfer of CNY 1,000,000 and the chance to play in the Chinese Super League at the beginning of the 2008 league season.

On 4 May 2014, Lü returned to his former club Harbin Yiteng for the first time when Changchun played them in the league. The reunion was not a happy one for Lü as Changchun lost the Round 10 game 3-1 as well as picking up a Yellow Card on a tackle against Wang Dalong, which the Harbin manager Xin Duan thought was too lenient.

In February 2015, Lü transferred to Chinese Super League side Henan Jianye. Lü moved to another Super League club Shijiazhuang Ever Bright on 26 February 2016. Unfortunately he was part of the team that was relegated, however by the 2019 league season he would help the team win promotion back into the top tier.

International career
After some decent performances for his club, Lü Jianjun was  called up to the Chinese U-23 team that took part in the 2007 Lunar New Year Cup. The team became runner-up in the competition and Lü Jianjun went on to be selected for the senior national team in March 2007. He did not see any playing time and returned to the Under-23 team in hopes of playing in the Football at the 2008 Summer Olympics but lost his place to Tan Wangsong.

Career statistics
.

References

External links
Career profile at sodasoccer.com
Player stats at sohu.com
 

1985 births
Living people
Association football fullbacks
Chinese footballers
Footballers from Dalian
Changchun Yatai F.C. players
Dalian Shide F.C. players
Zhejiang Yiteng F.C. players
Henan Songshan Longmen F.C. players
Cangzhou Mighty Lions F.C. players
Chinese Super League players
China League One players
China League Two players